Nite Klub Skewl is the debut album by dance band Massive Ego. It features the band's three earlier singles, and is composed mostly of covers. It also has songs written by the band, such as Murder which had been released as a radio edit on the My Heart Goes Bang single.
Two music videos were released to promote the album; Supernature and Planet Earth (Jewels & Stone Edit).

Track listing

Personnel

Marc Massive – vocals, lyrics
Steady – guitar (track 4)
Caron Geary The Infidel – featured vocals (track 1)
Dusty 'O' – featured vocals (tracks 6 & 11)
Maggie K DeMonde – featured vocals (track 7)
Zoe Fuller – featured vocals (track 5 & 8)
Jacquii Cann – backing vocals  (track 1)
Sally Jaxx – backing vocals (track 3)
Laura Harding – backing vocals (track 12)
Teresa Marie – backing vocals (track 13)
Ross Alexander – remix (track 6)
Andy J Thirwall – producer (tracks 7, 9 & 10)
Marc Massive – producer (tracks 7, 10 & 11)
Ross Alexander – producer (track 1, 3, 5, 8, 12 & 13)
Barry Stone – producer (track 2)
Sandy Burnett – producer (track 4)
Nick Crittenden & Paul Tams – producer (track 6)
Peter Maher – mastering
Bambi Fantastic – photography

References

External links
Official website

2007 debut albums
Massive Ego albums